Dialogue is a conversational exchange.

Dialogue(s) or dialog(s) may also refer to:

 Dialogue in writing, a verbal exchange between two or more characters

Art and culture

Philosophical concepts
 Socratic dialogue, a genre of philosophical literary prose developed mainly by Plato
 Dialogue (Bakhtin), the concept of dialogue in the philosophy of Mikhail Bakhtin
 Philosophy of dialogue, a type of philosophy based on the work of Martin Buber

Books
 Dialogue Concerning the Two Chief World Systems, a 1632 book by Galileo Galilei
 Dialogues (Pope Gregory), a collection of four books written by Pope Gregory I
Dialogs (Lem), a 1957 book-length essay by Polish science-fiction writer Stanisław Lem
 A Dialogue, a 1973 book by James Baldwin and Nikki Giovanni
 Dialogues (Gilles Deleuze), 1977 book of discussions between Deleuze and Claire Parnet

Journals
 Dialog (magazine), a magazine in Poland that publishes contemporary Polish and foreign plays
 Dialog (newspaper), a weekly newspaper from Varna city, Bulgaria, Europe
 Dialogue: A Journal of Mormon Thought
 Dialogue: Canadian Philosophical Review
 Dialogue, philosophy journal of Phi Sigma Tau
 Dialogue (magazine), a 1978–2004 art magazine

Classical music
 Dialogues, 1923 piano solo by Federico Mompou
 Dialogues 1, Op. 25, and Dialogues 2, Op. 62, by Carlos Veerhoff
 Dialogues II, Op. 126, by Frank Campo
 Dialogues II, for piano and chamber orchestra by Elliott Carter

Groups and labels
 Dialogue+, a Japanese idol group

Music albums
 Dialogue (Bobby Hutcherson album), 1965
 Dialogue, by Valery Leontiev, 1984
 Dialogues (Carlos Paredes & Charlie Haden album), 1990
 Dialogue (Four Tet album), 1999
 Dialogues (Houston Person and Ron Carter album), 2002
 Dialogues (Kenny Davern album), 2005
 A Dialogue, by Gwen Stacy, 2009
 Dialogue (Thavius Beck album), 2009
 Dialogues (Ivar Antonsen & Vigleik Storaas album), 2010
 Dialogue (Steve Weingart & Renee Jones album), 2011

Songs
 "Dialogue (Part I & II)", a 1972 song by Chicago

Television
 Dialogue, a television show on China Global Television Network formerly hosted by Yang Rui

Religion
 Dialogue Mass, a religious rite

Technology
 Dialog (architectural firm), a Canadian architectural, engineering, interior design and planning firm
 Dialog (online database), an information service
 Dialog (software), a shell script application that displays text user interface widgets
 Dialog Axiata, a Sri Lankan telecommunication company
 Dialog box, a type of user interface
 Dialog Semiconductor, a Germany technology company
 Dialogue system, a computer system intended to converse with a human
 , an HTML element
 Dyalog APL, a programming language implementation
 Ericsson Dialog, a telephone model
 Gorenje Dialog, a microcomputer system